40 Field Regiment (Asal Uttar), nicknamed the Roaring Forty is part of the Regiment of Artillery of the Indian Army.

Formation 
The Regiment was raised at Risalpur (presently in Pakistan) as 8 Indian Field Regiment on 1 February 1943 with the troop nucleus being of South Indian classes. The Regiment was then equipped with 25 Pounder guns.

History 
The Regiment became the first medium regiment of the Indian Army on 1 October 1944, when it was re-equipped with 5.5" guns. It was later re-designated as 40 Medium Regiment. The regiment was awarded with the prestigious Asal Uttar honour title for its exemplary display in the Battle of Asal Uttar in the 1965 Indo-Pak War. It acquired the status of a medium self propelled unit, when it was equipped with the M-46 Catapult, which had 130 mm guns mounted on a Vijayanta chassis. The regiment has subsequently converted to a field artillery regiment and is now equipped with Indian Field Guns.

The Regiment also had the honour of carrying Mahatma Gandhi's ashes for immersion in the Damodar River in Ramgarh on one of its guns in 1948.

The regiment had the honour to participate in the Republic Day Parades in 1979 with their 130 mm towed guns and in 1987 and 1989 with their Catapults.

Operations

Some of the major operations undertaken by the Regiment include:

Hyderabad Police Action (1948) 2nd Medium battery moved to Hyderabad in May 1948 in support of Smash Force / 1 Armoured Division to quell an armed insurrection aimed against the formal union of this princely state with the Union of India. Two guns recovered during the action, are exhibited at the unit's Quarter Guard.

Indo-Pakistani War of 1947–1948 1 Medium Battery participated in the J & K Operations to counter the armed incursion into the State. The 5.5" guns were dismantled and air-lifted in Dakotas to Kashmir. Exemplary courage and gallantry was displayed by Capt. Dara Dinshaw Mistri in the Naushera Sector on 15 December 1948. He was posthumously awarded the Maha Vir Chakra (MVC) for display of bravery and gallant action. (This was the first MVC in the Regiment of Artillery).

The official citation reads:

Indo-Pak War (1965) In September 1965, the Regiment was located in Meerut, when it received the mobilisation orders. The Regiment was part of Operation Riddle in the Khemkaran-Kasur Sector in which Pakistan's 1 Armoured Division advanced towards East of the Icchogil Canal. The Regiment with its 5.5" guns fired over 13,000 rounds at Kasur town, which halted the Pakistani advance for a day. The regiment lost two officers (2nd Lieutenant IK Gupta and 2nd Lieutenant LS Modi) in this operation.

Indo-Pakistani War of 1971 The Regiment's batteries were located at 3 different places when it received its mobilisation orders. One Battery (403 Medium Battery) stuck to their guns in Sikkim which could not be diverted to participate in the Operations. Without the 403 Medium Battery, 28 Medium Battery headed towards Dacca from Agartala RHQ and 29 Medium Battery entered the then East Pakistan (present day Bangladesh) from Bhajanpur. The Regiment was the first Artillery Regiment to reach Dacca.

1973 Provincial Armed Constabulary revolt On 22 May 1973, the Regiment was deployed for internal security duties at Varanasi to aid the civil authorities to quell the armed insurrection by the Uttar Pradesh Provincial Armed Constabulary (PAC) at Ramnagar and Chunar. One officer (Major N. N. Jally) and 10 other ranks were killed, but the rebellion was successfully quelled. Four Sena Medals were awarded to the Regiment.  500 PAC personnel surrendered to the Commanding Officer during the operation.

Others The Regiment has participated in counter insurgency operations in Punjab, in the Operation Parakram (2002), in the Siachen conflict in 2006 and Operation Rhino (Assam).

Equipment 
The regiment has had the following guns in chronological order -

25 Pounder guns
5.5 Inch Gun - from 1943
M-46 130 mm Field Gun - from 1978
M-46 Catapult - from 1984
Indian Field Gun

See also
List of artillery regiments of Indian Army

References 

Artillery regiments of the Indian Army after 1947
Military units and formations established in 1943